Eilema alluaudi is a moth of the subfamily Arctiinae first described by Hervé de Toulgoët in 1968. It is found on Madagascar.

References

Moths described in 1968
alluaudi